Zemetchino is an urban locality (an urban-type settlement) in Zemetchinsky District of Penza Oblast, Russia. Population:

Climate

References

Urban-type settlements in Penza Oblast